Aster rigidus  may refer to four different species of plants:
 Aster rigidus Soó, a synonym for Galatella sedifolia subsp. rigida (DC.) Greuter
 Aster rigidus Kuntze, a synonym for Solidago rigida subsp. rigida  L.
 Aster rigidus Moench, a synonym for  Pentanema salicinum (L.) D.Gut.Larr. et al.
 Aster rigidus L., a synonym for Ionactis linariifolia (L.) Greene